The Scouts of the World Award is an international Scout recognition administered by the World Organization of the Scout Movement.  It was developed to give "young people more opportunities to face the challenges of the future" as identified by the United Nations Millennium Declaration in 2000.  That declaration identified eight Millennium Development Goals and participation in the award helps one work towards those goals.

The award is designed to be administered through individual National Scout Organizations and is designed as a way to help improve the program of their senior sections.

Young people between the ages of 15 and 26 years are eligible to earn the award, regardless of Scout affiliation.  According to WOSM, "this fact provides NSOs with a great opportunity to increase their membership at the local and national levels, resulting from the possibility to invite non-Scout persons (in the age covered by the Rover section, 18-22) to participate in the Rover Programme, and to encourage them, after completing the Scouts of the World Award, to be part of the Rover section."

The Scouts of the World Award has two components: "the Scouts of the World Discovery" and "the Scouts of the World Voluntary Service."

The Scouts of the World Network is open to Scouts having obtained the Scouts of the World Award.

The Scouts of the World Partnership is made up of National Scout Organizations who have adopted the Scouts of the World Award.  As of 2007, the Scouts of the World Partnership comprises the following:
Interamerican Region
Scouts de Argentina
Asociación de Scouts de Bolivia
União dos Escoteiros do Brasil
Association des Scouts du Canada
Scouts Canada
Asociación de Guías y Scouts de Chile
Asociación Scouts de Colombia
Asociación de Guías y Scouts de Costa Rica
Asociación de Scouts del Ecuador
Asociación de Scouts de El Salvador
Asociación de Scouts de México, A.C.
Scouts de Nicaragua
Asociacion de Scouts del Peru
Movimiento Scout del Uruguay
Asociación de Scouts de Venezuela
European Region
The Danish Scout Association
Eclaireuses et Eclaireurs de France
Eclaireuses et Eclaireurs unionistes de France
Les Scouts et Guides de France
Eesti Skautide Ühing
Deutsche Pfadfinderschaft Sankt Georg (DPSG)
Scout Association of Greece
Scouting Ireland
Associazione Guide e Scouts Cattolici Italiani
Associazione Guide e Scouts Cattolici Italiani (AGESCI)
Israel Boy and Girl Scouts Federation
Lëtzebuerger Guiden a Scouten (Guides et Scouts du Luxembourg)
Scouting Nederland
Corpo Nacional de Escutas (Portugal)
The National Scout Organization of Romania
Scout Organization of Serbia
Scout Association of Slovenia (ZTS)
Scouts de España (ASDE)
The Swedish Guide and Scout Council
Scouting and Guiding Federation of Turkey
Swiss Guide and Scout Movement (SGSM)
The Scout Association (UK)
Asia-Pacific Region
The Scout Association of Australia
The Singapore Scout Association
Sri Lanka Scout Association
Scouts of China (Taiwan)
Scout Association of Hong Kong
Scout Association of Japan
Korea Scout Association
The Scouts Association of Malaysia (Persekutuan Pengakap Malaysia)
The Scout Association of Maldives
National Scout Organization of Thailand
Arab Region
Algerian Muslim Scouts
Egypt Scout Federation
Jordanian Association for Boy Scouts and Girl Guides
Fédération du Scoutisme Libanais
Scouts of Syria
Eurasia Region
Georgia Organization of the Scout Movement
Scout Association of Moldova
African Region
The Mauritius Scout Association
Confédération Sénégalaise du Scoutisme
Scouts South Africa
The Uganda Scouts Association
The Scout Association of Zimbabwe

See also
Rover Scout

References

Official Scouts of the World Award pages

Scout and Guide awards
World Organization of the Scout Movement